Elections to Liverpool City Council were held on Tuesday 1 November 1892. One third of the council seats were up for election, the term of office of each councillor being three years.

After the election, the composition of the council was:

Election result

Ward results

* - Retiring Councillor seeking re-election

Abercromby

Castle Street

Everton

Exchange

Great George

Lime Street

North Toxteth

Pitt Street

Rodney Street

St. Anne Street

St. Paul's

St. Peter's

Scotland

South Toxteth

Vauxhall

West Derby

Aldermanic Elections

At the meeting of the Council on 9 November 1892, the terms of office of eight alderman expired.

Two of these positions were already vacant :

The death of Alderman Henry Jennings had been reported to the Council on 26 October 1892.

The resignation of Alderman David MacIver had been reported to the Council on 26 October 1892.

The following eight were elected as Aldermen by the Council (Aldermen and Councillors) on 9 November 1892 for a term of six years.

* - re-elected aldermen.

By-elections

No. 9, Great George, 23 November 1892

Caused by the election of Councillor James Ruddin (Liberal, Great George, elected 2 November 1892)
as an alderman by the Council on 9 November 1891
.

No. 2, Scotland, 23 November 1892

Caused by the election of Councillor Dr. Alexander Murray Bligh (Irish Nationalist, Scotland, elected 2 November 1892) as an alderman by the Council on 9 November 1891
.

No. 3, Vauxhall, 23 November 1892

Caused by the election of Councillor Andrew Commins MP (Irish Nationalist, Vauxhall, elected 1 November 1891) as an alderman by the Council on 9 November 1892
.

No. 4, St. Paul's, 23 November 1892

Caused by the election of Councillor Philip Henry Rathbone JP (Liberal, St, Paul's, elected 1 November 1892) as an alderman by the Council on 9 November 1892
.

No. 8, Pitt Street - 2 seats, 23 November 1892

Caused by the election of Councillor Henry Charles Hawley (Liberal, Pitt Street, elected 1 November 1892) and Councillor Francis Joseph McAdam (Liberal, Pitt Street, elected 1 November 1890) as aldermen by the Council on 9 November 1892.

No. 7, St. Peter's, 23 November 1892

Caused by the election of Councillor William Benjamin Bowring (Liberal, St. Peter's, elected 1 November 1890) as an aldermen by the Council on 9 November 1892.

No. 8, Rodney Street - 2 seats, 23 November 1891

Caused by the election of Councillor Henry Charles Hawley (Liberal, Pitt Street, elected 1 November 1892) and Councillor Francis Joseph McAdam (Liberal, Pitt Street, elected 1 November 1890) as aldermen by the Council on 9 November 1892.

No. 11, Abercromby, 18 February 1893
Caused by the death of Councillor Dr. Nicholas Kennick Marsh (Conservative, Abercromby, elected 1 November 1890) on 2 February 1893.

See also

 Liverpool City Council
 Liverpool Town Council elections 1835 - 1879
 Liverpool City Council elections 1880–present
 Mayors and Lord Mayors of Liverpool 1207 to present
 History of local government in England

References

1892
Liverpool
1890s in Liverpool
November 1892 events